Aslauga pandora is a butterfly in the family Lycaenidae first described by Hamilton Herbert Druce in 1913. It is found in Cameroon, the Republic of the Congo, the Democratic Republic of the Congo (Uele, Sankuru, Ituri and Kasai) and Uganda (Unyoro).

References

External links
Michel Libert Image (bottom figure)

Butterflies described in 1913
Aslauga